The Vice Chief of Naval Staff (VCNS) is the post that is, in principle, the deputy and the second-in-command (S-in-C) of the Pakistan Navy and is also the most senior Principal Staff Officer (PSO) at NHQ, reporting and functioning under the Chief of the Naval Staff. This post is usually held by a senior flag officer of Vice Admiral rank.

Office holders

See also
 Vice Chief of Air Staff (Pakistan)
 Vice Chief of Army Staff (Pakistan)

References

Pakistan Navy